The West Island Shamrocks (Les Shamrocks du West Island in French) Are an ice hockey team based in Pierrefonds Quebec, Canada.  They are a part of the Quebec Junior AAA Hockey League. The franchise was founded in 2003 as the Île Perrot Mustangs but re-located to Vaudreuil-Dorion in 2004, and then relocated to Lac Saint Louis, known as the Revolution in 2017. The franchise has a new look in 2019 as the West Island Shamrocks.

Season-by-season record
Note: GP = Games Played, W = Wins, L = Losses, T = Ties, OTL = Overtime Losses, GF = Goals for, GA = Goals against, Pts = Points

External links
Shamrocks Webpage
Shamrocks Facebook page

References 

Ligue de Hockey Junior AAA Quebec teams